Paul Saurin (6 October 1903 – 15 May 1983) was a French politician.

Saurin was born in Hassi Mamèche, Algeria (then called Rivoli). He represented the Independent Radicals in the Chamber of Deputies from 1934 to 1940.

References

1903 births
1983 deaths
People from Mostaganem Province
People of French Algeria
Pieds-Noirs
Independent Radical politicians
Members of the 15th Chamber of Deputies of the French Third Republic
Members of the 16th Chamber of Deputies of the French Third Republic